Pakam (also Romanized as Pākam; also known as Pacham, Pāyekam, and Pāy-e Tom) is a village in Howmeh Rural District, in the Central District of Bam County, Kerman Province, Iran. At the 2006 census, its population was 876, in 214 families.

References 

Populated places in Bam County